The 2012 UK Kids Choice Awards took place on 1 April 2012 at 5:30PM. The show followed a similar format as the one in the United States, with seven unique categories for the UK. Voting started on February 20, 2012. Kids Choice Awards 2012 was viewed by 201,000 people.

Promotional Material
New promos were released early for the 2012 Kids' Choice Awards in the UK, with the first on January 20, 2012 during a new episode of Supah Ninjas. Some included scenes with Big Time Rush and the cast of Victorious explaining how to vote. There was also a promo with Will Smith (this year's host) entering the "Kids' Choice Headquarters". The UK edition included UK band, One Direction, talking to Will.
Promos used the same layout and style as Nick in the US.
All promotional material was voiced by Peter Dickson, also known as Voiceover Man.

UK Categories
This year the Nickelodeon UK Kids' Choice Awards had 7 unique categories this year, 5 more than previous years. Below is a list of UK categories and their nominees. Bold text represents the winner.

Favourite UK Band
 One Direction
 The Wanted
 Little Mix
 JLS

Favourite UK Female Artist
 Jessie J
 Adele
 Pixie Lott
 Cher Lloyd

Favourite UK Male Artist
 Olly Murs
 Tinie Tempah
 Ed Sheeran
 Professor Green

Favourite UK TV Show
 House of Anubis (Nickelodeon)
 X Factor (ITV)
 Doctor Who (BBC One)
 Tracy Beaker Returns (CBBC)

Favourite UK Newcomer
 Little Mix
 Cher Lloyd
 Tulisa
 One Direction

Favourite UK Actor
 Brad Kavanagh
 Robert Pattinson
 Daniel Radcliffe
 Matt Smith

Favourite UK Actress
 Emma Watson
 Karen Gillan
 Ana Mulvoy Ten
 Pixie Lott (in Fred: The Movie)

References 

Nickelodeon Kids' Choice Awards
2012 awards
2012 awards in the United Kingdom